Port St. Lucie High School (PSLHS) is a high school in the U.S. city of Port St. Lucie, Florida. It is located in the southeast area of St. Lucie County.

Campus and History 

The Port St. Lucie High School campus is a box shaped campus with a central, open commons area. PSLHS also has a variety of athletic facilities and is the only school with its own football stadium in St. Lucie County.

Port St. Lucie High School opened to grades 9 - 11 in August 1989 with an enrollment of approximately 1500 students; grades 9 - 12 thereafter. These students were made up of others from Fort Pierce Central High School and Fort Pierce Westwood High School. PSLHS later became an International Baccalaureate school in December 2007, joining Lincoln Park Academy as the only schools in St. Lucie County with the program, as well as the only public school in the district with the IB Program.

During the 2011/2012 school year, roughly half of the school's portable classrooms in the rear of the school were demolished and replaced with more permanent, hybrid models. The other half were replaced during the summer of 2012 and began use with the 2012/2013 school year.

Administration
 Principal - Nicole Telese
 Assistant Principal -  Gerald Earley (12th grade)
 Assistant Principal - Dr. Myrna Belgraves (11th grade)
 Assistant Principal - Bradley Lehman (10th grade)
 Assistant Principal -  Louisa Saget (9th grade)
 Dean- Kareem Rodriguez (11th & 12th grade) & Suzanne Power (9th & 10th grade)
 Athletic Director- Daniel Ninestine
 Director of School Counseling- Michael Galloway
 ESE Directors - Kaitlyn Kloser  & Mario Aleus

Academics
PSLHS offers a wide variety of academic classes and programs that are divided by grade level. All 9th Grade students take part in the Jaguar Preparatory Academy, a program designed to increase the cohesiveness of students and set them up for future success. All sophomores likewise take part in the Jaguar Lyceum. 11th through 12th graders enroll in an Academy based on a career interest or specialized programs, such as the International Baccalaureate Program, Visual and Performing Arts, or Applied Sciences. In total, PSLHS offers 6 Advanced Placement Courses, 12 Career Academies, and several additional elective programs to students, as well as Dual Enrollment courses in association with Indian River State College.

AP Courses
Port St. Lucie High School cut down on its Advanced Placement options from 11 available courses in the 2012-2013 school year to 6 available AP courses in the 2013-2014 school year to encourage enrollment in the International Baccalaureate Program. The following are still offered:
 American Government, Calculus, English Language & Composition, Human Geography, US History, World History

Career Academies
There are 2 divisions of Career Academies available at PSLHS:
 Visual, Performing Arts, and Technology Academy, which includes Eurhythmics (Color Guard), Instrumental & Vocal Music, Television Production, Theater, Web Design, and Visual Arts.
 Applied Sciences Academy, which includes Automotive Technology, Construction Trades, Culinary Operation, and Information Technology, Health Science, International Baccalaureate, and Military Science.

Preparatory Academies
Freshmen and sophomores are isolated from the rest of the school in their core courses.
 Jaguar Preparatory Academy (Freshman Academy) - The academy is organized into three "teams" (Team Alpha, Team Beta, and Team Gamma) which allows the teachers to collaborate in instruction of the students. Freshmen may take English (Regular English, Pre-IB English, or 9th grade Reading), Math (Algebra 1, Geometry, and Algebra 2 with optional Honors credit), Science (Physical Science, Physical Science Honors, or Pre-IB Biology), HOPE, Freshman Seminar, and AP Human Geography.
 Jaguar Lyceum (Sophomore Academy) - The academy is also organized into "teams". Students may take English (English 2, Pre-IB English 2, or AP English and Composition), Math (Geometry, Algebra 2, Analysis of Functions, and Pre-Calculus with optional Honors credit), Science (Biology or Chemistry with optional Honors credit), and World History (Regular, AP, or Honors).

Additional Elective Programs
 Band, Drama, Dance, Medical Skills, Spanish, US Army JROTC.

Extra-curricular Activities 
 Established in August 1993, the PSLHS Army JROTC program is one of the best JROTC units on the Treasure Coast and among the best in the state. Since its creation, the Jaguar Battalion has been an "Honor Unit with Distinction", the highest classification an Army JROTC unit can hold. The battalion hosts six Varsity level special teams, including a Drill Team, a Raider Adventure Team, an Orienteering Team, an Air Rifle Marksmanship Team, and a Color Guard, as well as a Tutoring Team and a Booster Club. The Jaguar Battalion's Drill Team has made multiple trips to both the States and National competitions, and has dominated local and District drill competitions for years.
 The PSLHS Marching Band, nicknamed "The Pride of Port St. Lucie", has long been one of the largest and most successful bands in Florida. The PSLHS Band has received continuous "Superior" ratings at the Florida Band Association District Music Performance Assessments over the past 20 years, as well as at the state level. The PSLHS Band has also taken part in the 2001 Fiesta Bowl activities, and the 2007 Fed Ex Orange Bowl Festivities, where it won multiple awards for their performances. The PSLHS Marching Band has won Several Awards at the Treasure Coast Crown Jewel Band Festival.  The PSLHS Band is currently under the direction of Mr.Troy Wiley. Past themes for the marching band have included the "Hits of Queen" in 2006, the "Music of Michael Jackson" in 2007, the "Music of Santana" in 2008, the "Music of Bon Jovi" in 2009, "Swing Time" in 2010, and the "Music of Chuck Mangione" in 2011, "Quidam" in 2012, "Angst" in 2013, "West Side Story" in 2015, "Man of Steel" in 2016, "Elements of the Mind" in 2017. The Port Saint Lucie High School Band consists of the Jaguar Marching Band, Concert Band, Symphonic Band, Symphonic Winds, Jazz Band, Percussion, Flag Auxiliary Corps, and Winter Guard.
 For years, PSLHS has become highly regarded for its Drama Program. Currently under the direction of Mr. Patrick Madden, the PSLHS Drama Department puts on two shows annually, in the summer and winter, with all showings having sold out for years. Plays have included The Sound of Music, Willy Wonka, Beauty and the Beast, The Little Mermaid, and a number of Broadway-level plays.
 PSLHS has also become highly regarded for its Dance Program. Currently under the direction of Mr. Brian Spector, the PSLHS Dance Department puts on one annual show each year during the Spring. Each of the annual shows are based on two different Broadway musicals and showcases a variety of dance styles such as ballet, hip-hop, and traditional ballroom dancing.

Sports 
Port St. Lucie High School offers 24 Varsity teams in 16 FHSAA recognized sports. The Jaguars, as well as the Lady Jags, have long had success in athletics, though no PSLHS team has won a Florida High School Athletic Association (FHSAA) State Championship. PSLHS is traditionally strong in Boys' Basketball, Wrestling, Baseball, and Competitive Cheerleading. Due to its high student population, PSLHS competes in the second highest FHSAA Division for most sports.

Fall Sports
 Boys' & Girls' Bowling, Boys' & Girls' Golf, Boys' & Girls' Cross Country, Girls' Volleyball, Boys' & Girls' Swimming, Football, Cheerleading

Winter Sports
 Boys' & Girls' Basketball, Boys' & Girls' Soccer, Girls' Weightlifting, Wrestling, Co-Ed Competitive Cheerleading

Spring Sports
 Boys' & Girls' Track and Field, Boys' and Girls' Tennis, Girls' Flag Football, Baseball, Softball, Special Olympics

Team State Runners Up
 2007- Baseball, Class 5A
 2010- Competitive Cheerleading, Large Co-Ed Division
 2011- Competitive Cheerleading, Large Co-Ed Division

Individual State Champions
 1996- Rupert Blackwood, Track & Field
 1997- Jason Casiano, Wrestling
 2000- Thelton Detry, Wrestling
 2011- Tori Degginger, Wrestling (Florida Women's State Wrestling Championship)
 2012- Tori Degginger, Wrestling (Florida Women's State Wrestling Championship)

Individual State Runners Up
 1996- Jason Casiano, Wrestling
 1999- Hebrews Josue, Wrestling
 2000- Mario Rinaldi, Wrestling
 2002- A.J. Rinaldi, Wrestling
 2003- George Keyser, Wrestling
 2005- Jason Harrison, Bowling

Notable Accomplishments 
 1990- Football, District Champions (The 1990 championship is the only one for football in school history, and was in the school's second year in existence. It followed a winless inaugural season.)
 1997- Baseball, USA Today High School Player of the Year- Rick Ankiel
 1998/99- Wrestling, National High School Coaches Association All-American, #8 In Nation- Hebrews Josue
 1999 and 2007- FHSAA Boys' Basketball "Final Four"
 2010 and 2011- The PSLHS Competitive Cheerleading Squad won back-to-back FHSAA State Runner Up titles behind the four-time defending State Champion Sebring High School.
 2011- Competitive Cheerleading- Won the Inaugural FHSAA Region 4 Championship (Large Co-Ed Division).
 2010-2011 Wrestling, Class 3A District 9 Champions
 2011-2012 Wrestling, Class 3A District 9 Champions

PSLHS has produced a large number of collegiate athletes and consistently produces 10-15 every year.

Notable alumni
Rick Ankiel - former MLB outfielder. 
Jon Coutlangus - former MLB pitcher
Larry Sanders - professional basketball player
 Paul Rodriguez - retired mixed martial arts fighter
Din Thomas - retired mixed martial arts fighter
Albert Wilson - NFL player, Miami Dolphins
Donald De La Haye - CFL player, Toronto Argonauts and YouTube personality

References

External links 
 
St. Lucie Public Schools 
PSLHS's JROTC Website 

High schools in St. Lucie County, Florida
Port St. Lucie, Florida
Public high schools in Florida